Palazzia ramosa is a species of sea snail, a marine gastropod mollusk, unassigned in the superfamily Seguenzioidea, the turban snails.

Distribution
This marine species occurs off New Zealand.

References

 Powell, A.W.B. 1979: New Zealand Mollusca: Marine, Land and Freshwater Shells. Collins, Auckland. 500 Pp

External links
 To Encyclopedia of Life
 To World Register of Marine Species

ramosa
Gastropods described in 1940